Republic was a station stop along the Ronkonkoma Branch which served employees of the Fairchild Engine & Airplane Manufacturing Company and the nearby Republic Airport from 1940 to the late 1980s. As part of a double-tracking project on the line, the station may be reopened.

History

Original station
Republic station opened on December 9, 1940, with simple wooden shelters for passengers. When electrification was extended from Hicksville to Ronkonkoma in the 1980s, the LIRR proposed to close the stops at Republic, Grumman, Pineaire, Brentwood, and Deer Park to speed travel times and to avoid the cost of building high level platforms at lightly used stations. The latter two were ultimately kept, but Republic closed in either 1986 or 1987 due to its low ridership and the high cost of new platforms. The old station platforms have been removed, but the two staircases down to Route 110 remain, though gated off.

Proposed reopening
As part of the project 
that added a second track from Farmingdale to Ronkonkoma, the MTA is considering reopening Republic station. The reopened station would serve the Route 110 corridor, a major north–south commercial route. The station was cut from the project in 2010 due to budgetary issues, but revived in 2012. The MTA Board included money for planning and engineering in the approved 2015-2019 Capital Plan, and anticipates funding construction through a future Capital Plan.

References

External links
Grumman and Republic and the Long Island Rail Road (Arrt's Arrchives)
Former staircases visible on Google Maps Street View

Railway stations in the United States opened in 1940
Railway stations closed in 1987
Airport railway stations in the United States
Former Long Island Rail Road stations in Suffolk County, New York
1940 establishments in New York (state)
1987 disestablishments in New York (state)